= Honored Architect of Azerbaijan =

“Honored architect” is an honorary title of Azerbaijan, awarded for special services in the development of urban planning and architecture. The title “Honor architect” was established by the presidential decree dated April 19, 2000.

== Assignment ==
Honorary title is awarded by the president of Azerbaijan. In accordance with the decree on “Honored Architect of Azerbaijan” only citizens of Azerbaijan awarded with this honorary title. However, Honored architect cannot be assigned to the same person twice.

There are a number of occasions such as conviction of a serious crime and offense are reasons for deprivation of the honorary title.

== Laureates ==
In 2000, the honorary title was assigned to Agil Ahmedzadeh, Elkin Aleskerov, Nariman Aliyev, Parviz Aliyev, Ahmed Ismayilov, Rahim Seyfullayev, Hacimurad Shugayev and Faig Yuzbashiyev. Gulcohre Mammedova, Vidadi Muradov, Sabir Orujov, Amina Vakilova and Mammad Ibrahimov were awarded in 2006. Laureates of 2007 were Ofelia Babayeva, Abbas Alesgarov, Feyzulla Guliyev, Zulfugar Mammadov and Islam Yuzef. Elxan Asadov was awarded in 2009. During the years of 2012-2014, the title of “Honored Architect” was assigned to Akif Abdullayev, Ilgar Isbatov, Nargiz Abdullayeva, Famil Agayev, Ilgar Beylerov, Nariman Imamaliyev, Gulara Ismayilova, Fatma Ahmedova, Sanan Salamzadeh, Akif Aliyev, Yegana Haciyeva, Aybeniz Hasanova, Zahide Mammadova, Nelli Seyfullayeva and Ali Rustamli.
